Katleri is a subdistrict in the district of Lasnamäe, Tallinn, the capital of Estonia. It has a population of 5,133.

Gallery

References

External links

Subdistricts of Tallinn